was a Japanese discus thrower. She competed at the 1952, placing fourth, and the 1956 Summer Olympics.

From 1949 until 1956 she became Japanese champion eight times in a row.

References

External links

1920 births
2015 deaths
Japanese female discus throwers
Japanese female long jumpers
Japanese pentathletes
Japanese female shot putters
Japanese female sprinters
Olympic female discus throwers
Olympic athletes of Japan
Athletes (track and field) at the 1936 Summer Olympics
Athletes (track and field) at the 1952 Summer Olympics
Athletes (track and field) at the 1956 Summer Olympics
Asian Games gold medalists for Japan
Asian Games gold medalists in athletics (track and field)
Asian Games medalists in athletics (track and field)
Athletes (track and field) at the 1951 Asian Games
Athletes (track and field) at the 1954 Asian Games
Medalists at the 1951 Asian Games
Medalists at the 1954 Asian Games
Japan Championships in Athletics winners
20th-century Japanese women